The Uranoceratidae is a family of Silurian barrandeoceroids that tend to become uncoiled with age and in which siphuncle segments tend to be expanded into the camerae.

Description
Shells of uranoceratids are gyroconic. Early stages of a few species are annulated.  Later stages of all are smooth or faintly striated or cancellated. In many, septal necks are straight, but in others recumbent on one side or the other. Connecting rings are thin.

Derivation and content
The Uranoceratidae are derived from Bickmorites.  Genera include:
Uranoceras
Jolietoceras
Cumingsoceras, and
Cliftonoceras.

References

Prehistoric nautiloid families
Late Ordovician first appearances
Silurian extinctions